A Stablecoin is a type of cryptocurrency where the value of the digital asset is supposed to be pegged to a reference asset, which is either fiat money, exchange-traded commodities (such as precious metals or industrial metals), or another cryptocurrency. 

In theory, 1:1 backing by a reference asset could make a stablecoin value track the value of the peg and not be subject to the radical changes in value that are common in the market for many digital assets. In practice, however, stablecoin issuers have not been proven to maintain adequate reserves to support a stable value.

Background 
Stablecoins have a number of purported purposes. They can theoretically be used for payments, and are in theory more likely to retain their value than cryptocurrencies which are highly volatile. In practice, many stablecoins have failed to retain their "stable" value.

Stablecoins are typically non-interest bearing, and therefore do not provide interest returns to the holder.

Reserve-backed stablecoins
Reserve-backed stablecoins are digital assets that are stabilized by other assets. Furthermore, such coins, assuming they are managed in good faith, and have a mechanism for redeeming the asset(s) backing them, are unlikely to drop below the value of the underlying physical asset, due to arbitrage. However, in practice, few if any stablecoins actually meet these assumptions.

Backed stablecoins are subject to the same volatility and risk associated with the backing asset. If the backed stablecoin is backed in a decentralized manner, then they are relatively safe from predation, but if there is a central vault, they may be robbed, or suffer loss of confidence.

Fiat backed 
The value of stablecoins of this type is based on the value of the backing currency, which is held by a third-party–regulated financial entity. In this setting, the trust in the custodian of the backing asset is crucial for the stability of price of the stablecoin.  Fiat-backed stablecoins can be traded on exchanges and are redeemable from the issuer. The cost of maintaining the stability of the stablecoin is equivalent to the cost of maintaining the backing reserve and the cost of legal compliance, maintaining licenses, auditors and the business infrastructure required by the regulator.

Cryptocurrencies backed by fiat currency are the most common and were the first type of stablecoins on the market. Their characteristics are:

 Their value is pegged to one or more currencies (most commonly the US dollar, the euro, and the Swiss franc) in a fixed ratio;
 The value connection is realized off-chain, through banks or other types of regulated financial institutions which serve as depositaries of the currency used to back the stablecoin;
 The amount of the currency used for backing of the stablecoin should reflect the circulating supply of the stablecoin.

Examples: TrueUSD (TUSD), USD Tether (USDT), USD Coin.

In January 2023, National Australia Bank announced that it would create by mid-2023 an Australian Dollar fiat-backed stablecoin called the AUDN, for streamlining cross-border banking transactions and trading carbon credits.

Commodity-backed 
The main characteristics of commodity-backed stablecoins are:

 Their value is fixed to one or more commodities and redeemable for such (more or less) on demand;
 There is an implied or explicit promise to redeem, by unregulated individuals, agorist firms, or even regulated financial institutions;
 The amount of commodity used to back the stablecoin should reflect the circulating supply of the stablecoin.

Holders of commodity-backed stablecoins can redeem their stablecoins at the conversion rate to take possession of the backing assets, under whatever rules as to timing and amount are in place at the time of redemption. The cost of maintaining the stability of the stablecoin is the cost of storing and protecting the commodity backing.

Cryptocurrency-backed 
Cryptocurrency-backed stablecoins are issued with cryptocurrencies as collateral, which is conceptually similar to fiat-backed stablecoins. However, the significant difference between the two designs is that while fiat collateralization typically happens off the blockchain, the cryptocurrency or crypto asset used to back this type of stablecoins is done on the blockchain, using smart contracts in a more decentralized fashion. In many cases, these work by allowing users to take out a loan against a smart contract via locking up collateral, making it more worthwhile to pay off their debt should the stablecoin ever decrease in value. To prevent sudden crashes, a user who takes out a loan may be liquidated by the smart contract should their collateral decrease too close to the value of their withdrawal.

Significant features of crypto-backed stablecoins are:
 The value of the stablecoin is collateralized by another cryptocurrency or a cryptocurrency portfolio;
 The peg is executed on-chain via smart contracts;
 The supply of the stablecoins is regulated on-chain, using smart contracts;
 The price stability is achieved through introduction of supplementary instruments and incentives, not just the collateral.

The technical implementation of this type of stablecoins is more complex and varied than that of the fiat-collateralized kind which introduces a greater risks of exploits due to bugs in the smart contract code. With the tethering done on-chain, it is not subject to third-party regulation creating a decentralized solution. The potentially problematic aspect of this type of stablecoins is the change in value of the collateral and the reliance on supplementary instruments. The complexity and non-direct backing of the stablecoin may deter usage, as it may be difficult to comprehend how the price is actually ensured. Due to the nature of the highly volatile and convergent cryptocurrency market, a very large collateral must also be maintained to ensure the stability.

Live stablecoins projects of this type are Havven (the pair: nUSD stablecoin and HAV the collateral-backed nUSD), DAI (pair: CDP Collateralized Debt Position and MKR governance token used to control the supply) and others. There is also Wrapped Bitcoin (WBTC), see BitGo.

Seigniorage-style/algorithmic stablecoins (not backed)
Seigniorage-style coins, also known as algorithmic stablecoins, utilize algorithms to control the stablecoin's money supply, similar to a central bank's approach to printing and destroying currency. Seigniorage-based stablecoins are a less popular form of stablecoin.

Algorithmic stablecoins are a type of stablecoin intended to hold a stable value over the long term because of particular computer algorithms and game theory rather than a peg to a reserve asset. In practice, some algorithmic stablecoins have not maintained price stability. For example, the "UST" asset on the Terra blockchain was theoretically supported by a reserve asset called "Luna", plummeted in value in May 2022. Wired magazine said "The Ponzinomics were just too obvious: When you pay money for nothing, and stash your nothing in a protocol with the expectation that it will give you a 20 percent yield—all you end up with is 20 percent of nothing."

Significant features of seigniorage-style stablecoins are:

 Adjustments are made on-chain,
 No collateral is needed to mint coins,
 Value is controlled by supply and demand through algorithms, stabilizing price.

Basis was one example of a seigniorage-style coin.

TerraUSD (UST), created by Do Kwon, was meant to maintain a 1:1 peg with the United States dollar. Instead of being backed by dollars, UST was designed to keep its peg through a complex system connected with another Terra network token, Terra (LUNA). In May 2022 UST broke its peg with its price plunging to 10 cents, while LUNA fell to "virtually zero", down from an all-time high of $119.51. The collapse wiped out almost $45 billion of market capitalization over the course of a week.

On 13 June 2022, Tron's algorithmic stablecoin, USDD, lost its peg to the US Dollar.

Possible advantages 
The Bank of International Settlements lists the possible merits of the subject as enhancement of anti-money laundering efforts, operational resilience, customer data protection, financial inclusion, tax compliance, and cybersecurity.

Risks and criticisms

Lack of regulation 
Nellie Liang, Under Secretary of the Treasury for Domestic Finance reported to the Senate banking committee that the rapid growth of the stablecoin market capitalization and its potential for financial services innovation require urgent congressional regulation.

Lack of transparency 
Tether is currently the world's largest market capitalization stablecoin. It has been accused of failing to produce audits for reserves used to collateralize the quantity of minted USDT stablecoin. Tether has since issued assurance reports on USDT backing, although some speculation persists.

De-pegging 
Many projects can advance a product and call it a stablecoin. Thus, despite the name, many stablecoins have historically lacked stability because the digital assets can be built to many different standards. 
Stablecoins such as TerraUSD, USDD, DEI and others crashed to zero in 2022 alone.

Other concerns 
Griffin and Shams' research attributed the creation of unbacked USDT to the rise in Bitcoin's price in 2017. Following that, research indicated little to no evidence that Tether USD minting events influenced Bitcoin values unless they were publicized to the public by Whale Alert.

Failed and abandoned stablecoin projects
The stablecoin project Basis, which had received over $100 million in venture capital funding, shut down in December 2018, citing concerns about US regulation.

Diem (formerly Libra) was abandoned by Facebook/Meta and later purchased by Silvergate Capital.

References

Cryptocurrencies